DZRB (95.9 FM) was a radio station owned and operated by Nation Broadcasting Corporation.

History
The station began operations in 1985 as MRS 95.9, airing an adult contemporary format. In 1998, after NBC was acquired by PLDT subsidiary MediaQuest Holdings, the station rebranded as Nikki @ Rhythms 95.9 and switched to a Top 40 format. In 2002, Earthsounds Broadcasting System took over the station's operations and rebranded it as 95.9 Crosswave, carrying a smooth jazz format. In 2006, Southern Broadcasting Network took over the station's operations and rebranded it as Mom's Radio 95.9. In 2009, Audiowav Media took over the station's operations, along with NBC's stations in Visayas and Mindanao, and relaunched it as WAV FM, carrying a Top 40 format. It went off the air sometime in 2012.

References

Radio stations in Naga, Camarines Sur
Radio stations established in 1985